, also known as My Very Own Hero, is a Japanese yaoi manga series written and illustrated by Memeco Arii about the romances between a teacher and his student, and the teacher's younger brother with his childhood friend. It has been serialized in Ichijinsha's Gateau since February 2012. An anime television series adaptation by Encourage Films aired from July 8, 2017 to September 23, 2017, and is licensed in English by Sentai Filmworks.

Plot
Masahiro Setagawa has stopped believing in heroes as he believes that heroes do not truly exist, especially since he has been getting into a lot of trouble. He's been coerced into joining a gang and is often bullied and used as a gopher boy. However, soon an infamous street fighter named Kousuke Ooshiba, or the "Bear Killer" inadvertently saves him. This man happens to be the older brother of his best friend Kensuke Ooshiba and his current homeroom teacher. Now Kousuke has claimed Masahiro as his "underling" and promises to protect him, but the feelings seem to run far deeper for both. Meanwhile, Kensuke is reunited with an old friend Asaya Hasekura, a popular pretty boy who declares his love for Kensuke and leaves Kensuke confused and unsure.

Characters

A weakling delinquent who used to be searching a place to belong to. He is very adept to cooking and housework because his mother doesn't really care about doing much. He likes small animals and seems to be quite informed about it. Despite having the same family name (as the two are brothers), he still calls Kensuke by the name of Ooshiba even when around Kosusuke. He has dyed blond hair whose original color is bright orange.

A high school teacher, teaching mathematics. He is very affectionate and often meddles into Masahiro's life.

Kousuke's younger brother and Masahiro's best friend since junior high school. He often invites his friends to play and eat at the Ooshiba's house. He was a childhood friend of Asaya but currently is his boyfriend. Despite he and Ayake are siblings, Kensuke still refers to Asaya by the family name Hasekura, and even calls his sister .

A handsome boy who is very popular among other students. He has big appetite and eats surprisingly quickly. He is Kensuke's boyfriend and is very possessive towards him.

Media

Manga
Hitorijime My Hero began serialization in Ichijinsha's boy's love magazine Gateau in February 2012, and so far the chapters have been collected into 13 volumes. The series is a spin-off of Memeco Arii's earlier Hitorijime Boyfriend manga and currently has over 700,000 copies in print. Kodansha USA's manga imprint Kodansha Comics announced during their panel at Anime Expo 2018 that they have licensed the manga.

Hitorijime Boyfriend

Hitorijime My Hero

Chapters not yet published in volume format
These chapters have yet to be published in a tankōbon volume. They were originally serialized in Japanese in issues of Ichijinsha's Gateau since their August 2022 issue.

Hitorijime My Hero #72
Hitorijime My Hero #73
Hitorijime My Hero #74
Hitorijime My Hero #75
Hitorijime My Hero #76
Hitorijime My Hero #77
Hitorijime My Hero #78
Hitorijime My Hero #79

Anime
An anime television series adaptation directed by Yukina Hiiro and animated by Encourage Films aired from July 8, 2017 to September 23, 2017, and has been licensed for an English release by Sentai Filmworks. The opening theme song is "Heart Signal" by Wataru Hatano and the ending theme is "True Love" covered by the voice actors of the four main characters. The anime adaptation rearranges some plot from the manga's story, starting chronologically from Masahiro and Kousuke's meeting and then continues to the main plot of Hitorijime Boyfriend, before continuing back to the main plot of Hitorijime My Hero.

List of episodes

References

External links
 

2017 anime television series debuts
Anime series based on manga
Anime Strike
Encourage Films
Ichijinsha manga
Japanese LGBT-related animated television series
Romance anime and manga
School life in anime and manga
Sentai Filmworks
Yaoi anime and manga
2010s Japanese LGBT-related television series